The Kuznetsov NK-22 is an afterburning turbofan engine, designed by the Kuznetsov Design Bureau.

Development
In April 1967, the Kuznetsov Design Bureau accepted an official request to create a new engine that would later be designated as the NK-22. The design of the NK-22 was based on the NK-144 engine used on the Tupolev Tu-144 SST.

The first specimen of the engine was completed on April 10, 1968 and the first factory tests where passed in the same month. State tests took place in October 1970. The engines where later installed on Tu-22M0, M1 and M2 bombers. Serial production of the NK-22 started in 1969 and was terminated in 1984.

A modernised version of the NK-22, the NK-23, first ran in July 1976 and was tested in flight on a Tupolev Tu-22M2 bomber. Despite having more thrust (220 kN) than its predecessor, the NK-23 was not put into serial production.

Applications
 Tupolev Tu-22M0, M1 and M2

Specifications (NK-22)

See also

References

Low-bypass turbofan engines
1960s turbofan engines
Kuznetsov aircraft engines